The Cruelest Day is a 2003 Italian drama film directed by Ferdinando Vicentini Orgnani. It is a dramatization of the last days of life of RAI journalist Ilaria Alpi and of her cameraman Miran Hrovatin before they were killed in Mogadishu, Somalia, on March 20, 1994. For her performance Giovanna Mezzogiorno won the Nastro d'Argento for best actress.

Cast 
Giovanna Mezzogiorno: Ilaria Alpi
Rade Šerbedžija: Miran Hrovatin
Erika Blanc: Luciana Alpi 
Giacinto Ferro: Giorgio Alpi 
Angelo Infanti: Giancarlo Marocchino
Amanda Plummer: Karin 
Andrea Renzi: Francesco 
Tony Lo Bianco: General Loy

References

External links

2003 films
Italian drama films
2003 drama films
Drama films based on actual events
Films set in Somalia
2000s Italian films